Donk! Samurai Duck! is a video game featuring a duck named Donk, who was raised by samurai warriors. To prove himself he has set off to collect crystals from 112 levels of earth. Once the target quota of gems has been reached, Donk escape from each level through one of its many exits, giving the game a similar structure to Alien Breed: Tower Assault. Magical powers can be collected along the way, including the ability to turn into an inflatable toy duck, which makes it possible to float across water. There is a simultaneous split-screen 2-player mode included as well.

Development
The game was originally going to be released with the title Dong, but the British developers did not want to cause offence as the word can mean "penis" in English speaking countries. The name was changed at the last moment to Donk. Some demo versions distributed on Amiga cover disks still bore the name Dong.

Legacy
In 2006-7 there was an attempt to port the game to the Dreamcast involving the original creators of Donk!. The project was never completed.

References

1994 video games
Amiga games
Amiga 1200 games
Amiga CD32 games
Japan in non-Japanese culture
Platform games
Video games about samurai
Video games about birds
Video games developed in the United Kingdom

fr:Donk
hr:Donk